Tito Castillo (20 July 1914 – 14 January 2000) was a Salvadoran sports shooter. He competed in the 50 metre pistol event at the 1968 Summer Olympics.

References

1914 births
2000 deaths
Salvadoran male sport shooters
Olympic shooters of El Salvador
Shooters at the 1968 Summer Olympics
People from Santa Tecla, El Salvador